This is a list of episodes from the CBS sitcom The New Adventures of Old Christine. The program ran on CBS in the United States from March 13, 2006 to May 12, 2010, broadcasting 88 episodes over five seasons. Every single episode was directed by Andy Ackerman, also one of the executive producers of the show.



Series overview

Episodes

Season 1 (2006)

Season 2 (2006–07)

Season 3 (2008)

Season 4 (2008–09)

Season 5 (2009–10)

References

External links
 

New Adventures of Old Christine